Sant' Emiliano in Congiuntoli is a medieval abbey, now disused and private property, serving as a farmhouse in the comune (township) of Scheggia e Pascelupo in Umbria, central Italy. The large and almost windowless church is a powerfully austere example of Romanesque architecture.

See also
Medieval commune

External links
Sant'Emiliano in Congiuntoli - Official website
Sant'Emiliano in Congiuntoli Fastnet page

Emiliano in Congiuntoli
Romanesque architecture in Umbria